is a Japanese manga by Kyūta Minami. It was adapted into a live-action film in 2005.

Awards
27th Yokohama Film Festival
 10th Best Film

References

External links

 

1996 manga
Live-action films based on manga
Films directed by Tomoyuki Furumaya
2000s Japanese-language films
Josei manga
Shodensha franchises
Shodensha manga
2000s Japanese films